Dr. No's Oxperiment is the third album by hip hop rapper and producer Oh No. The solely instrumental album was released by Stones Throw Records in 2007, and is described as "an audio tour of Turkish, Lebanese, Greek, and Italian psyche funk".

Track listing
"Heavy" – 1:54 (Samples "Ince Ince" by Selda Bağcan) 
"Gladius" – 1:22
"Higher" – 1:33
"Breakout" – 1:25
"Ox Broil" – 1:52 (Samples "Dağlar Dağlar" by Barış Manço) 
"Bouncers" – 1:36 (Samples "Sür Efem Atini" by Mazhar ve Fuat) 
"Alarmsss" – 1:25
"Banger" – 1:31
"No Guest List" – 1:20
"Land Mine" – 1:29
"My Luck" – 1:45 (Samples "Üsküdar'a Giderken" by Mustafa Özkent) 
"Cosmos" – 1:49 (Samples "Uzun Ince Bir Yoldayim" by Barış Manço)
"Exp Out The Ox" – 1:01 (Samples "Yaylalar" by Selda Bağcan) 
"Emergency" – 1:42 (Samples "Acıhda Bağa Vir!" by Barış Manço) 
"Ohhhhhh" – 1:00
"Deliveries" – 1:07 (Samples "Emmioğlu" by Mustafa Özkent) 
"Come Back" – 1:05
"Hot Fire" – 1:35
"Action" – 1:38 (Samples "Kalk Gidelim Küheylan" by Barış Manço ) 
"Ghetto" – 1:30 (Samples "Gönül Dağı" by Barış Manço) 
"Fast Gamble" – 1:05
"All Over" – 0:49 
"Mad Piano" – 1:33
"Oxcity Sickness" – 1:45 (Samples "Alla Beni Pulla Beni" by Barış Manço) 
"Cassette" – 1:43 (Samples "Çöpçüler Kralı" by Serhat Görücü) 
"Down Under" – 0:38
"Smokey Winds" – 1:21
"Slow Down" – 1:13

All tracks written by Oh No.

References

External links
 Oh No on Stones Throw
 Oh No on MySpace
 Stones Throw Records

Oh No (musician) albums
Instrumental hip hop albums
Stones Throw Records albums
2007 albums
Albums produced by Oh No (musician)